Baba Mungipa Law College is in Pilani, Rajasthan, India, is affiliated to the University of Rajasthan, Jaipur, which was established in 1988. It is approved by Bar Council of India.

References

Law schools in Rajasthan
Jhunjhunu district
Educational institutions established in 1988
1988 establishments in Rajasthan